Corsico is a comune (municipality) in the Province of Milan in the Italian region Lombardy, bordering Milan on the southwest.

Corsico received the honorary title of city with a presidential decree on 22 July 1987. Corsico is served by Corsico railway station.

International relations

Twin towns - sister cities
Corsico is twinned with:
 Malakoff, France, since 1970
 Mataró, Spain, since 1993
 San Giovanni a Piro, Italy, since 2015

References
Notes

External links

Official website

Cities and towns in Lombardy